Rear Admiral Kathleen Lousche Martin (born January 14, 1951) served as Deputy Surgeon General of the Navy/Vice Chief, Bureau of Medicine and Surgery from October 2002 until her retirement in September 2005.  She also held the position as the 19th Director of the Navy Nurse Corps from August 1998 to August 2001. She serves on the board of directors for Caliburn International, a military contracting conglomerate that also oversees operations of Homestead Temporary Shelter for Unaccompanied Children.

Early life
Rear Adm. Martin is a native of Arnold, Pennsylvania.

Navy Nurse Corps career
Kathleen L. Martin was commissioned an Ensign in May 1973 after graduating from Boston University. Following Officer Indoctrination School in Newport, R.I., she served at Naval Hospital, Camp Lejeune, North Carolina, as a staff nurse and later as a charge nurse in pediatrics. In 1976, she reported to Navy Recruiting District, Philadelphia, as the Medical Programs Officer.

From 1979 to 1982, Rear Adm. Martin was assigned to Naval Hospital, Jacksonville, Florida, as the charge nurse of the pediatric ward. Following this tour of duty, she was assigned to Naval Medical Clinic, Pearl Harbor, Hawaii. During this period her duties included Division Officer of Military Medicine, Credentials Coordinator, Risk Manager, and Quality Assurance Coordinator.

In 1986, she was transferred to Naval Hospital, San Diego, California and served as head of the Ambulatory Medical Nursing Department, which encompassed eight medical specialty clinics. Rear Adm. Martin attended the University of San Diego from 1990 to 1992.  Following duty under instruction, she was assigned to Naval Medical Clinic, Port Hueneme, California, as the Director of Nursing Services.

Rear Adm. Martin assumed her first command in 1993 as Commanding Officer of Naval Medical Clinic, Port Hueneme. Subsequently, she served as Commanding Officer, Naval Hospital, Charleston, S.C., from July 1995 to June 1998. She was promoted to the rank of rear admiral and assigned as the medical inspector general from August 1998 to October 1999. From November 1999 to October 2002, she served as commander of National Naval Medical Center. She also held the position as the 19th director of the Navy Nurse Corps from August 1998 to August 2001.

Education
Martin graduated from Boston University School of Nursing in 1973.  She attended the University of San Diego from 1990 to 1992, earning a Master of Science degree in both nursing administration and as a family health nurse specialist.

Awards
Military decorations include the Distinguished Service Medal (two awards), Legion of Merit (three awards), the Defense Meritorious Service Medal, Meritorious Service Medal and the Navy Commendation Medal. She is a member of the American College of Healthcare Executives, the American Society for Public Administration, the Association of Military Surgeons of the United States and Sigma Theta Tau.

  Navy Distinguished Service Medal with Gold Star
  Legion of Merit with two Gold Stars
  Defense Meritorious Service Medal
  Meritorious Service Medal
  Navy Commendation Medal

See also
Navy Nurse Corps
Women in the United States Navy

References

External links
Nurses and the U.S. Navy -- Overview and Special Image Selection Naval Historical Center

1951 births
Living people
Boston University School of Nursing alumni
American women nurses
University of San Diego alumni
Female admirals of the United States Navy
United States Navy rear admirals (upper half)
Recipients of the Meritorious Service Medal (United States)
Recipients of the Legion of Merit
Recipients of the Navy Distinguished Service Medal
American women chief executives
American health care chief executives
21st-century American women